Tomás Ó Súilleabháin (born 1973 in Dublin) is an Irish actor. He regularly appears on Irish television and in film roles. Ó Súilleabháin regularly contributes to the Irish Language arts.

Selected filmography

Film
Arracht (2019) - Director/Writer
Song of the Sea (2014) - Spud and Bus Driver (voices; Irish version)
Fifty Dead Men Walking (2008) - RUC Officer
Studs (2006)
Trouble with Sex (2005)
Adam & Paul (2004)
The Fixer (2004)
Intermission (2003)
On the Edge (2001)
Underworld (1999)

Television
 Acceptable Risk (TV Series - 6 episodes) (2017)
Rásaí na Gaillimhe (TV Series) (2009)
The Clinic (2008)
Bill (2008)
The Running Mate (2007)
Showbands (Drama Series) (2006)
Fergus's Wedding (2002)
Paths to Freedom (2003)
On Home Ground

Music
Showbands - Original Soundtrack (2006)

External links

TV.COM
Tomas O'Suilleabhain at film.com
Tomas O'Suilleabhain MP3

References

1973 births
20th-century Irish people
21st-century Irish people
Irish male film actors
Irish male stage actors
Irish male television actors
Irish male voice actors
People from County Dublin
Living people